William Edward McCormick (April 17, 1831 – March 12, 1900) was an American lawyer, businessman, and politician from New York.

Life 
McCormick was born on April 17, 1831 in Ithaca, New York. He was the son of Jacob Miller McCormick, a veteran of the War of 1812 and prominent Ithaca resident, and Catherine Conrad. His maternal side was of Dutch ancestry. His paternal great-grandfather was Joseph McCormick, a Scotch-Irish immigrant who lived near the Giants' Causeway in County Antrim and came to America in 1760.

McCormick attended Union College in Schenectady, graduating in 1850 at the age of 19. He then studied law in the law office of prominent Ithaca attorneys Ferris and Cushing, and was admitted to the bar in 1852. He initially practiced law in Ithaca, but later switched to railroad work. As he already took a course on civil engineering at Union College, he moved to Indiana and joined a classmate also working with railroads.

McCormick later moved to New York City, where he intended to practice law, but Augustus Whiton, the superintendent of the Eastern Division of the Erie Railroad, convinced him to accept a position with the Erie Railroad. He would come to work for them for fifteen years. In 1856, he moved to Port Jervis, initially as a fuel agent for the Delaware Division and later as resident engineer and paymaster. He later worked with the freight department in New York City and Chicago.

In 1870, McCormick permanently moved to Port Jervis, where he worked in the real estate and insurance business and dealt in musical instruments. He served a number of local offices, including village president, a member of the board of trustees, justice of the peace, sewer commissioner, village treasurer, a member of the board of education, chief engineer of the fire department, and police justice.

In 1891, McCormick was elected to the New York State Assembly as a Democrat, representing the Orange County 2nd District. He served in the Assembly in 1892.

In 1873, McCormick married Mary Gertrude Broadhead of Port Jervis. Their son Frank died young. McCormick was a member of the Presbyterian church and led the singing for more than 30 years.

McCormick died at home on March 12, 1900. He was buried in Laurel Grove Cemetery.

References

External links 

 The Political Graveyard
 William E. McCormick at Find a Grave

1831 births
1900 deaths
Politicians from Ithaca, New York
People from Port Jervis, New York
American people of Scotch-Irish descent
American people of Dutch descent
Union College (New York) alumni
New York (state) lawyers
American real estate brokers
School board members in New York (state)
American justices of the peace
19th-century American politicians
Democratic Party members of the New York State Assembly
Burials in New York (state)
Presbyterians from New York (state)
19th-century American judges
19th-century American lawyers
19th-century American businesspeople